Erbessa integra is a moth of the family Notodontidae first described by Cajetan and Rudolf Felder in 1874. It is found in Brazil.

References

Moths described in 1874
Notodontidae of South America
Moths of South America